Carlo Francesco Airoldi (1637–1683) was a Roman Catholic prelate who served as Titular Archbishop of Edessa in Osrhoëne (1673–1683), Apostolic Nuncio to Venice (1675–1683), Apostolic Nuncio to Florence (1673–1675), and Apostolic Internuncio to Belgium (1668–1673).

Biography
Carlo Francesco Airoldi was born in Milan, Italy in 1637.
On 16 November 1668, he was appointed during the papacy of Pope Clement IX as Apostolic Internuncio to Belgium; he resigned on 8 April 1673.
On 26 June 1673, he was appointed during the papacy of Pope Clement X as Titular Archbishop of Edessa in Osrhoëne.
On 30 July 1673, he was consecrated bishop by Gasparo Carpegna, Cardinal-Priest of San Silvestro in Capite, with Stefano Brancaccio, Bishop of Viterbo e Tuscania, and Giannotto Gualterio, Archbishop of Fermo, serving as co-consecrators at the church of San Bernardo alle Terme in Rome. 
On 5 November 1673, he was appointed during the papacy of Pope Clement X as Apostolic Nuncio to Florence; he resigned on 3 October 1675.
On 29 November 1675, he was appointed during the papacy of Pope Clement X as Apostolic Nuncio to Venice.
He served as Apostolic Nuncio to Venice and Titular Archbishop of Edessa in Osrhoëne until his death on 5 April 1683. 
He is buried in the cathedral in Milan.

References

External links and additional sources
 (for Chronology of Bishops)  
 (for Chronology of Bishops)  

17th-century Roman Catholic titular bishops
Bishops appointed by Pope Clement X
Bishops appointed by Pope Clement IX
1637 births
1683 deaths
Apostolic Nuncios to the Republic of Venice
Apostolic Nuncios to the Republic of Florence
Apostolic Nuncios to Belgium